Steve Burns is a former American soccer coach. He served as the inaugural head coach of the Michigan Bucks and Michigan Wolverines men's soccer team.

Coaching career

Michigan Bucks
Burns served as the inaugural head coach of the Michigan Bucks of the Premier Development League from 1996 to 1999. During his tenure as head coach he led the Bucks to a 69–28–0 record, and four consecutive divisional titles. He helped lead them to national finalist finishes in 1996 and 1997 and advanced to the round of 16 in the 1999 U.S. Open Cup.

University of Michigan
Burns was the Michigan club team's head coach from 1993 until the program earned varsity status in 2000. He helped lead the club to six consecutive appearances in the national club championship tournament, and won back-to-back national club titles in 1997 and 1998. On September 28, 1999, he was named the inaugural head coach for Michigan Wolverines men's soccer team. His most successful season was in 2010 when he led the team to a 17–5–3 record, and their first Big Ten Tournament championship in program history. The team also advanced to the College Cup where they lost to eventual tournament champion Akron in the national semifinals.

He served as head coach for the Wolverines until he resigned on November 30, 2011. During his tenure as head coach he led the Wolverines to a 122–98–22 overall record. He helped Michigan produce 11 All-Big Ten first team honors, and 10 second-team all-conference honors, while three Wolverines earned NSCAA All-America honors during his tenure.

Head coaching record

References

Living people
American soccer coaches
Michigan Wolverines men's soccer coaches
Year of birth missing (living people)